Young Hearts is a 1944 German drama film directed by Boleslaw Barlog and starring , Ingrid Lutz, and . The film's sets were designed by art director Anton Weber. It was made by German's largest studio of the era UFA. The film was shot at the Babelsberg Studios and at the Hostivar Studios in Prague.

It portrays a love affair between a young couple that takes place in Berlin.

Cast

References

Bibliography

External links 
 

1944 films
German drama films
Films of Nazi Germany
1940s German-language films
Films directed by Boleslaw Barlog
UFA GmbH films
Films set in Berlin
Films shot at Babelsberg Studios
German black-and-white films
1944 drama films
1940s German films